La Première is a French network of radio and television stations operating in France's overseas departments and collectivities around the world.

History

The service was first established in 1954 as the Radiodiffusion de la France Outre-Mer (RFOM). It was renamed a year later as the Société de radiodiffusion de la France d'outre-mer (SORAFOM).

This was replaced in 1964, following the creation of the Office de Radiodiffusion Télévision Française, by the Office de coopération radiophonique (OCORA).

In August 1974, OCORA became a part of the reformulated FR3: a network of regional television stations in mainland France. FR3's overseas operations were known as FR3 DOM-TOM and, unlike the arrangement in metropolitan France, were in charge of both television and radio.

In December 1982, France's overseas broadcasting operations were removed from FR3 and invested in the current organization, the Société de Radiodiffusion et de télévision Française pour l'Outre-mer (RFO).

In July 2004, Réseau France Outre-mer (RFO) was reunited with the French mainland's public broadcasters when it was merged into the France Télévisions network.

On 30 November 2010, Réseau France Outre-mer was renamed Réseau Outre-Mer 1ère.

Network services

Radio and television 
La Première network manages nine generalist television channels and nine radio stations, broadcast in the eleven regions, departments or communities of Overseas France. They bear the name of "Pays" La Première, where "Country" is replaced by the name of the department or territory. The group also owns the former national television channel France Ô and the national radio station, Radio Outre-mer La Première (formerly Radio Ô).

La Première radio is available only in overseas territories/departments and on the Internet via the website www.la1ere.fr. The content changes depending on what radio station you're listening to online or depending on where you live in the overseas territories/departments just like France 3 does with the regional news bulletins such as 12/13, Soir 3 or other regional shows. It also offers free streaming online for radio and TV. The television broadcast on the website is only for those who live in the overseas territories/departments.

Note that the territory of French Southern and Antarctic Lands (TAAF) does not have a dedicated station as the population is transient and non-indigenous. Broadcasts, stories and breaking news concerning TAAF would be handled by Réunion La Première as they arise as oversight of TAAF is headquartered in the Réunionnaise commune of Saint Pierre. The other territory without a station, Clipperton Island, also has no permanent population and is actually private property of the French government.

External links

  

Television stations in France
Radio stations in France
France Télévisions
1954 establishments in France
Television channels and stations established in 1954